The genus Fringilla is a small group of finches from the Old World, which are the only species in the  subfamily Fringillinae. The genus name Fringilla is Latin for "finch".

Taxonomy
The genus Fringilla was introduced in 1758 by the Swedish naturalist Carl Linnaeus in the tenth edition of his Systema Naturae. The genus name Fringilla is Latin for "finch". Linnaeus included 30 species in the genus (Fringilla zena was listed twice) and of these the common chaffinch (Fringilla coelebs) is considered as the type species.

Species
The genus now contains four species:

The common chaffinch is found primarily in forest habitats, in Europe, North Africa, and western Asia; the blue chaffinches are island endemics; and the brambling breeds in the northern taiga and southern tundra of Eurasia.

The four species are about the same size,  in length, and are similar in shape. They have a bouncing flight with alternating bouts of flapping and gliding on closed wings. They are not as specialised as other finches, eating both insects and seeds. While breeding, they feed their young on insects rather than seeds, unlike other finches.

In 2016, it was proposed that the extremely rare Gran Canaria subspecies F. teydea polatzeki be treated as a separate species, thus creating a fourth species, F. polatzeki.

References

External links 

 Internet Bird Collection: Finches, Crossbills, and Allies

 
Bird genera
Taxa named by Carl Linnaeus